Huacareta Airport,  is an airstrip  south of the village of Huacareta in the Chuquisaca Department of Bolivia.

Huacareta is within a fold of the Cordillera Central mountain range, and there is high terrain east and west of the runway.

See also

Transport in Bolivia
List of airports in Bolivia

References

External links 
OpenStreetMap - Huacareta
OurAirports - Huacareta
Fallingrain - Huacareta Airport
HERE/Nokia - Huacareta

Airports in Chuquisaca Department